Gevorgyan or Gevorgian, sometimes also spelled Gevorkian is an Armenian surname meaning "son of Gevorg", the equivalent of "son of George" (compare English Georgeson). The Western Armenian equivalent is Kevorkian. 

Gevorgyan can refer to the following people:

Persons
 Ara Gevorgyan (born 1960), an Armenian musician
 Arayik Gevorgyan (born 1973), an Armenian Freestyle wrestler
 Arsen Gevorgyan (born 1975), an Armenian judoka
 Artur Gevorgyan (born 1975), an Armenian-American boxer
 Edgar Gevorgyan (born 1982), an Armenian weightlifter
 Maria Gevorgyan (born 1994), an Armenian chess player
 Nahapet Gevorgyan (born 1957), an Armenian politician
 Pavel Gevorgyan (born 1963), a Russian scientist
 Vahan Gevorgyan (born 1981), an Armenian-born Polish footballer
 Eva Gevorgyan (born 2004), a Russian-Armenian classical pianist

Institutions
Gevorkian Theological Seminary, theological school-college of the Armenian Apostolic Church founded by Catholicos Gevork IV in 1874 and located in the city of Vagharshapat (Echmiadzin), Armenia

See also
 Gevorkyan
 Kevorkian (disambiguation)

Armenian-language surnames
Patronymic surnames
Surnames from given names